The Pakistan National Accreditation Council (PNAC) is a department subordinate to the Ministry of Science and Technology of the Government of Pakistan, of which Fawad Chaudhry is minister from 18 April 2019.

Formation and Objective
The Pakistan National Accreditation Council was formed in the year 1998, after Pakistan joined the World Trade Organization (WTO). The main objective of the Council is to regulate and accredit laboratories and certification bodies.

Mutual Recognition Agreements
The Council has mutual recognition agreements with the International Laboratory Accreditation Cooperation (ILAC) and the Asia Pacific Laboratory Accreditation Cooperation (APLAC).

References

External links
 PNAC official website
 Ministry of Science and Technology

Pakistan federal departments and agencies
Science and technology in Pakistan
Government agencies established in 1998
1998 establishments in Pakistan
Accreditation organizations